Carol Chaikin is an American jazz instrumentalist and composer. She attended Berklee College of Music. Her eponymous first album was released in 1990 by Gold Castle Records.

Early life and education
Chaikin was born in Los Angeles. She attended Berklee College of Music, studying flute and alto saxophone under Joe Viola, graduating in 1980. She lived and worked in New York City for sixteen years. She performs with the York Quartet and as a freelance musician in Los Angeles.

Discography
 Carol Chaikin (Gold Castle, 1990)
 Lucy's Day Off (1998)

References

External links
 Official site

American women composers
American women jazz musicians
American jazz alto saxophonists
American jazz composers
Women jazz composers
American jazz flautists
Year of birth missing (living people)
Living people
Jazz musicians from California
Musicians from Los Angeles
Musicians from New York City
Berklee College of Music alumni
20th-century American saxophonists
20th-century American women musicians
20th-century American musicians
20th-century American composers
Jazz musicians from New York (state)
21st-century American saxophonists
Women jazz saxophonists
21st-century American women musicians
20th-century women composers
20th-century jazz composers
20th-century flautists
21st-century flautists